The Wilkinsons were a Canadian country music trio from Belleville, Ontario. Founded in 1997, the group consisted of lead singer Amanda Wilkinson, her brother Tyler Wilkinson, and their father, Steve Wilkinson. The Wilkinsons achieved success late in 1998 with the hit single "26 Cents", a Number One on the Canadian country music charts and Top 5 hit on the U.S. Billboard Hot Country Singles & Tracks (now Hot Country Songs) charts. It was followed by "Fly (The Angel Song)", also a No. 1 in Canada. A second album, Here and Now, produced the group's last American top 40 hit in "Jimmy's Got a Girlfriend". Afterward, the trio recorded three more albums, one of which was not released, and a Greatest Hits package.

History

Beginnings
Steve Wilkinson was born on August 18, 1955, in Belleville, Ontario, Canada. Before the country trio was formed, he was struggling financially after he lost his job at a nuclear power plant due to downsizing. He took menial jobs in order to provide for his family, but his real passion was music. They signed to Giant Records in 1998.

Breakthrough
The Wilkinsons' first album, Nothing But Love, reached No. 16 on the Billboard Top Country Albums charts in 1998. The trio was nominated for the Country Music Association's Horizon Award and Vocal Group of the Year and for Single of the Year by the Academy of Country Music Awards. Their second album, Here and Now, won the Canadian Country Music Association award for Best Album. The band has received nine Canadian Country Music Awards, one Juno Award and two Grammy nominations (both for Best Country Performance by a Duo or Group).

Move to BNA Records
In 2001, Giant closed its Nashville division while "I Wanna Be That Girl" was climbing, leading to the band's third Giant album (Shine) not being released. Shortly thereafter, the trio was signed to BNA Records. Weeks before the release of their first single for BNA, the label's president wanted Amanda to record a solo album, which would ultimately disband the trio. The trio eventually left the label and signed with the independent Canadian label Open Road Records for their 2005 album, Highway.

Solo work
Amanda Wilkinson signed with Universal South Records and released her solo debut album, Amanda Wilkinson. Amanda received four nominations at the 2006 Canadian Country Music Awards (Single of the Year, CMT Video of the Year, Female Artist of the Year, and Album of the Year).

Tyler started the alternative rock band Motion Picture Ending. The band was composed of drummer and long-time friend Justin Devries, bassist Curtis Weekes, guitarist Greg Bolton, with Tyler as lead vocalist and guitarist.

Greatest Hits… and Then Some
In 2007, The Wilkinsons won Independent Group of the Year at the Canadian Country Music Awards.

Greatest Hits… and Then Some, a greatest hits album, was released on October 7, 2008. The first single, "When I'm Old", was released in mid 2008.

Small Town Pistols
In the late 2000s, the Wilkinsons disbanded. Amanda and Tyler founded a new duo called Small Town Pistols in 2012.

Reality television

The Wilkinsons were also the subject of a fictionalized "reality" television program on the CMT Canada network, The Wilkinsons. The show follows the family as they move back to The Quinte Area, Ontario, from Nashville, Tennessee. In 2006, the show was nominated for Country Music Program or Special of the Year at the Canadian Country Music Awards.

Discography 

 Nothing but Love (1998)
 Here and Now (2000)
 Shine (2001 - Shelved album)
 Highway (2005)
 Home (2007)

References

Canadian country music groups
Family musical groups
Participants in Canadian reality television series
Vocal trios
Canadian musical trios
BNA Records artists
Giant Records (Warner) artists
Juno Award winners
Canadian Country Music Association Rising Star Award winners
Canadian Country Music Association Single of the Year winners
Canadian Country Music Association Song of the Year winners
Canadian Country Music Association Group or Duo of the Year winners
Canadian Country Music Association Album of the Year winners
Canadian Country Music Association Fans' Choice Award winners